Mary Walling Blackburn (born California) is an artist, writer, and feminist who works and lives between New York, where she is an artist and director of the Anhoek School and its sister radio station WMYN, and Dallas where she teaches art at Southern Methodist University.  She is also described as "“a singer, a tutor, a choreographer, a documentary filmmaker, a tourist, a critic and a translator” with a strong but politically uncategorizable activist streak."

Anhoek School 

Blackburn created the Anhoek School as an educational experiment, an alternative to the GRE system. It is an all-women's graduate school that bases its curriculum on cultural production. Tuition is based on a barter system where student labor is exchanged for classes.  Its name is a "purposeful malappropriation" of the name Ann Hutchinson, a midwife in the Massachusetts Bay Colony expelled on charges of heresy, witchcraft and political anarchy.

Publications 

 Sister Apple, Sister Pig, 2014.
 Art in America, After Glenn Beck’s Blast, a Conversation with Mary Walling Blackburn, Vogel, Wendy, 2015.
 E-flux Journal #92: Sticky Notes 1–3, 2018.

References

External links
 Website 
 Art Matters Foundation

Feminist artists
University of New Hampshire alumni
Southern Methodist University faculty
21st-century American artists
21st-century American women artists
Artists from California
Living people
Year of birth missing (living people)
American women academics